Chetone histrio, or Boisduval's tiger, is a moth of the family Erebidae. It was described by Jean Baptiste Boisduval in 1870. It is found in Honduras, Guatemala and Peru.

Subspecies
Chetone histrio histrio
Chetone histrio histrionica Lamas & Grados, 1996

References

Chetone
Moths described in 1870